One Yellow Rabbit Performance Theatre (OYR) is based in the Big Secret Theatre in Calgary’s Arts Commons. With its Resident Performing Ensemble, OYR creates original theatrical works each year for its home audiences and also hosts The High Performance Rodeo, Calgary’s International Festival of the Arts.

OYR was founded in 1982, operating as a collective until coalescing into the OYR Performing Ensemble circa 1987-8. In its history, the company has created almost 80 full-length original productions. Ensemble personnel have remained relatively consistent since then, and OYR established a professional administrative staff. The company’s philosophy and practice has been influenced by contemporary dance, the Artist run centre movement, the Punk subculture, and the do-it-yourself creed.

In 1987, OYR produced the Secret Elevator Experimental Performance Festival, later renamed the High Performance Rodeo in 1988. The festival has grown annually in audience, venues, and impact, surpassing 10,000 attendees in 2006 and 16,000 in 2009. It now reaches over 20,000 audience members every year. The Rodeo features theatre, dance, music and multimedia presentations from across Canada and abroad. Artists presented in recent years range from hundreds of emerging artists to Philip Glass, Catalyst Theatre, Electric Company Theatre, Compagnie Marie Chouinard, Laurie Anderson, Andy Jones, members of The Kids In the Hall, Les Deux Mondes, Peggy Baker, Daniel MacIvor, and the OYR Ensemble itself. His Excellency Jean-Daniel Lafond was the Rodeo’s Honorary Patron from 2008-2009. He and Governor General Michaëlle Jean attended performances and hosted three “Art Matters” community forums as part of the festival.

OYR has toured across North America, Australia, Asia, Mexico and Europe. The 1990s saw a large increase in the number and frequency of tours, starting with the productions The Erotic Irony of Old Glory and Ilsa, Queen of the Nazi Love Camp. Scotland's Traverse Theatre was often the launching pad for international tours.

In 1995, OYR expanded the Secret Theatre into the Big Secret Theatre, increasing its technical versatility and doubling seating to 130. Seating was further upgraded in 2002 to a potential 249 (although most theatre shows play in the 189-seat configuration.)

In 1998, OYR's Denise Clarke founded the Summer Lab Intensive school of performance creation, attended by 20 students from across Canada. The 2009 Lab was the 13th annual edition. 250 “labbits” have graduated.

In 2003, Banff Centre Press published Wild Theatre: The History of One Yellow Rabbit by Martin Morrow. The book contains prefaces by Ronnie Burkett and Factory Theatre's Ken Gass.

See also
List of festivals in Calgary

References

External links

Theatre in Calgary
Theatre companies in Alberta
1982 establishments in Alberta